Julia Kathleen Beckett (born 4 July 1986) is an English competitive swimmer who has represented Great Britain in the Olympics and FINA world championships, and England in the Commonwealth Games.

Beckett was born in Winchester, Hampshire, England, and attended Loughborough University.

At the 2006 Commonwealth Games in Melbourne, Australia, she earned a silver medal as part of the runner-up English team in the 4x200-metre freestyle relay, together with teammates Joanne Jackson, Kate Richardson and Melanie Marshall.

Competing for Great Britain in the 2008 FINA Short Course World Championships in Manchester, Beckett won a bronze medal as a member of the third-place British women's team in the 4x100-metre freestyle relay.  At the 2008 Summer Olympics hosted by Beijing, China, she swam for the British team in the preliminary heats of the women's 4×100-metre freestyle relay.

External links
British Olympic Association athlete profile

Living people
1986 births
Commonwealth Games silver medallists for England
English female swimmers
English female freestyle swimmers
Medalists at the FINA World Swimming Championships (25 m)
Olympic swimmers of Great Britain
Sportspeople from Winchester
Swimmers at the 2006 Commonwealth Games
Swimmers at the 2008 Summer Olympics
Commonwealth Games medallists in swimming
Medallists at the 2006 Commonwealth Games